The 2018 New Orleans Bowl was a college football bowl game played on December 15, 2018, with kickoff scheduled for 9:00 p.m. EST (8:00 p.m. local CST). It was the 18th edition of the New Orleans Bowl, and one of the 2018–19 bowl games concluding the 2018 FBS football season. Sponsored by freight company R+L Carriers, the game was officially known as the R+L Carriers New Orleans Bowl.

Teams
The game featured the Middle Tennessee Blue Raiders from Conference USA and the Appalachian State Mountaineers, the 2018 Sun Belt Conference champions. The teams previously met three times (1974, 1989, and 1992) with Middle Tennessee holding a 2–1 edge in the series.

Middle Tennessee Blue Raiders

Middle Tennessee was defeated in the 2018 Conference USA Football Championship Game on December 1; they subsequently received and accepted an invitation to the New Orleans Bowl on December 2. The Blue Raiders entered the bowl with an 8–5 record (7–1 in conference). Blue Raider quarterback Brent Stockstill is the son of head coach Rick Stockstill.

Appalachian State Mountaineers

Appalachian State defeated Louisiana in the 2018 Sun Belt Conference Football Championship Game to secure a berth in the New Orleans Bowl. The Mountaineers entered the bowl with a 10–2 record (7–1 in conference). Due to the resignation of head coach Scott Satterfield, who took the same position with the Louisville Cardinals on December 4, the Mountaineers were coached in the bowl game by interim head coach Mark Ivey.

Game summary

Scoring summary

Statistics

References

External links

Box score at ESPN

New Orleans Bowl
New Orleans Bowl
New Orleans Bowl
New Orleans Bowl
Appalachian State Mountaineers football bowl games
Middle Tennessee Blue Raiders football bowl games